Jan Verner Tranefelt (1730–1806) was a Swedish military officer who served under Gustav III of Sweden.

Career
1773:  (lieutenant colonel)
1780:  (colonel)

Bibliography

Generalmönsterrulla för Bohus Lähns Lätta Dragonregemente 1783

1730 births
1806 deaths
Swedish military personnel
People of the Russo-Swedish War (1788–1790)
Gustavian era people